The 2018 Ligue Haïtienne season is the 55th season of top-tier football in Haiti. It began on 17 February 2018 and ended on 27 December 2018. The league Championnat National Haïtien Professionnel is split into two tournaments—the Série d'Ouverture and the Série de Clôture—each with identical formats and each contested by the same 16 teams.

Teams

At the end of the 2017 season, the bottom three teams in the aggregate table; Éclair AC, America FC, and Juventus; were relegated to the Haitian second-level leagues. Replacing them were three clubs from the Haitian second-level leagues; Arcahaie FC, Valencia FC, and Cosmopolites SC.

Série d'Ouverture

The 2018 Série d'Ouverture began on 17 February 2018 and the regular season ended on 6 May 2018. The playoffs began on 9 May 2018 and ended on 27 May 2018.

Regular season

Standings

Results

Playoffs

Quarterfinals
The first legs were played on 9 and 10 May and the second legs were played on 13 May.

Semifinals
The first legs were played on 16 and 17 May and the second legs were played on 20 May.

Finals
The first leg was played on 24 May and the second leg was played on 27 May.

Série de Clôture

The 2018 Série de Clôture began on 1 September 2018 and the regular season ended on 11 December 2018. The playoffs began on 6 December 2018 and ended on 27 December 2018.

Regular season

Standings

Results

Playoffs

Quarterfinals
The first legs were played on 6 December 2018 and the second legs were played on 9 December 2018.

Semifinals
The first legs were played on 13 December 2018 and the second legs were played on 16 December 2018.

Finals
The first leg was played on 20 December 2018 and the second leg was played on 23 December 2018.

The second match between Arcahaie FC and Don Bosco FC was called off due to darkness with the penalty shootout even at 5-5. Due to this, a playoff match was played on 27 December 2018 to determine a season champion.

Trophée des Champions
This match is contested between the winner of the Série d'Ouverture and the winner of the Série de Clôture. This match was played on 30 December 2018.

Aggregate table

References

External links
RSSSF

2018
Haiti
Haiti
2018 in Haitian sport